Silvanidae, "silvan flat bark beetles", is a family of beetles in the superfamily Cucujoidea, consisting of 68 described genera and about 500 described species. The family is represented on all continents except Antarctica, and is most diverse at both the generic and species levels in the Old World tropics.

Description
Silvanids generally are small, brownish, flattened, pubescent and densely punctured beetles ranging from 1.2-15mm in length, and mostly with a 5-5-5 tarsal formula. They have short, strongly clubbed, to very elongate antennae, and frequently grooves or carinae on the head and/or pronotum. Many genera have the lateral margins of the pronotum dentate or denticulate. The family is divided unequally into two subfamilies: Brontinae and Silvaninae. The Brontinae, arranged in two tribes (Brontini and Telephanini) of 10 genera each, are larger, loosely jointed beetles with long antennae, an especially elongate scape, inverted male genitalia, and mandibular mycangia. Both brontine tribes have recently been reviewed at the genus level. The Silvaninae, which has not been divided into tribes, consists of 48 genera of mostly smaller beetles characterized by their closed procoxal cavities, mostly without mandibular mycangia, and non-inverted male genitalia.

Taxonomy
The largest genera are Telephanus (109 species), Psammoecus (81 species), and Cryptamorpha (27 species) (all Brontinae: Telephanini) and the Old World silvanine genus Airaphilus (35 species). There have been a number of major taxonomic studies in the Silvanidae in recent decades, including Halstead (1973), Sen Gupta and Pal (1996), Pal (1981, 1985), and Karner (1995, 2012).

Investigations into the phylogenetic relationships within the family and between the Silvanidae and other cucujoids are at the preliminary stages. A phylogenetic analysis of the "primitive" cucujoids using morphological characters of larvae and adults found a close relationship between the Silvanidae and Cucujidae. A molecular phylogenetic study primarily aimed at clarifying the status of the more "advanced" cucujoids nevertheless included exemplars of the basal taxa. It showed a close relationship between Passandridae and Silvanidae, and a more distant one with Cucujidae.

Biology and habitats

Although all silvanids seem to be primarily fungivorous, the habitat where the various taxa are found varies. Members of the tribe Brontini primarily are found under dead bark, although Brontoliota are found on the outside of dead wood lying on the ground in wet forests and Protodendrophagus occur under rocks in alpine areas of New Zealand. Brontini do not have lobed tarsomeres. Members of Telephanini usually occur on withered, pendant leaves, especially of Musaceae and Heliconiaceae. Telephanini usually have lobed tarsomeres. Silvaninae are found in subcortical habitats as well as in leaf-litter and soil. Two genera, Nepharis and Nepharinus, are inquilines of ants in Australia, and two species of Coccidotrophus and one of Eunausibius occur in the petioles of ant-plants (Tachigalia spp.) in the American tropics, where they feed on honeydew produced by a mealybug (Hemiptera: Pseudococcidae).

Ten genera are represented by species that have been moved widely through commerce and now have worldwide or nearly worldwide distributions (e.g., Ahasverus, Oryzaephilus, Silvanus, Cryptamorpha, Monanus.) The most economically important genus is Oryzaephilus, with two common stored products pest species (O. surinamensis (L.), the sawtoothed grain beetle, and O. mercator (Fauvel), the merchant grain beetle), and several others that are sporadic pests  Other economically important stored products pests include Ahasverus advena (Waltl), Cathartus quadricollis (Guerin-Meneville), and Nausibius clavicornis (Kugelann).

Genera
Acathartus Grouvelle, 1912
Acorimus Halstead, 1980
Afrocorimus Halstead, 1980
Afronausibius Halstead, 1980
Ahasverus Des Gozis, 1881
Airaphilus Redtenbacher, 1858
Aplatamus Grouvelle, 1912
Astilpnus Perris, 1866
Australodendrophagus  Thomas, 2004
Australohyliota  Thomas, 2004
Austronausibius Halstead, 1980
Austrophanus Thomas 2008
Brontoliota  Thomas, 2004
Brontopriscus Sharp, 1886
Calpus Halstead, 1973
Cathartosilvanus Grouvelle, 1913
Cathartus Reiche, 1854
Coccidotrophus Schwarz & Barber, 1921
Cryptamorpha Wollaston, 1854
Dendrophagella  Thomas, 2004
Dendrophagus Schoenherr, 1809
Eunausibius Grouvelle, 1912
Euplatamus Sharp 1899
Indophanus Pal, 1982
Macrohyliota Thomas, 2004
Megahyliota Thomas, 2004
Megapsammoecus Karner, 1995
Metacorimus Halstead, 1997
Microhyliota Thomas, 2004
Monanus Sharp, 1879
Nausibius Redtenbacher, 1858
Neosilvanus Grouvelle, 1912
Nepharinus Grouvelle, 1912
Nepharis Laporte de Castelnau, 1869
Notophanus Thomas, 2011
Oryzaephilus Ganglbauer, 1899
Parahyliota Thomas, 2004
Parasilvanus Grouvelle, 1912
Pensus Halstead, 1973
Protodendrophagus Thomas, 2004
Protosilvanus Grouvelle, 1912
Psammaechidius Fairmaire, 1869
Psammoecus Latreille in Cuvier, 1829
Pseudonausibius Halstead, 1980
Pseudosilvanus Grouvelle, 1912
Saunibius Halstead, 1997
Silvaninus Grouvelle, 1912
Silvanoides Halstead, 1973
Silvanolomus Reitter, 1912
Silvanoprus Reitter, 1911
Silvanops Grouvelle, 1912
Silvanopsis Grouvelle, 1892
Silvanosoma Brèthes, 1922
Silvanus Latreille, 1807
Synobius Sharp, 1899
Synoemis Pascoe, 1863
Telephanus Erichson, 1845
Uleiota Latreille, 1796

Extinct genera 

 Subfamily Brontinae Erichson, 1845
 Tribe Brontini Erichson, 1845
 †Cretoliota Liu, Slipiñski, Wang et Pang, 2019 Burmese amber, Myanmar, Mid Cretaceous (latest Albian-earliest Cenomanian)
 †Protoliota Liu Slipiñski, Wang et Pang, 2019 Burmese amber, Myanmar, Mid Cretaceous (latest Albian-earliest Cenomanian)

References

 
Cucujoidea families